Barbara Ann Corcoran (born March 10, 1949) is an American businesswoman, investor, syndicated columnist, and television personality. She founded The Corcoran Group, a real estate brokerage in New York City, which she sold to NRT for $66 million in 2001 and shortly thereafter exited the company. One of the show's original "Shark" investors, Corcoran has appeared in all 14 seasons of ABC's Shark Tank to date. As of January 2023, she has made 130 deals on the show, the largest being a $350,000 investment for 40% of Coverplay.

Corcoran is a columnist for More, The Daily Review, and Redbook, writes a weekly column in the New York Daily News, and has written several books. She has been featured on Larry King Live and NBC's Today show, and hosts The Millionaire Broker with Barbara Corcoran on CNBC.

Early life and education
Corcoran was born in Edgewater, New Jersey, the second of 10 children in a working class Irish-Catholic family. Her mother, Florence, was a homemaker. Her father, Edwin W. Corcoran Jr., bounced from job to job throughout Corcoran's childhood. At times, her family relied on deliveries of free food from a friendly local grocer. Corcoran remembers her father as a man who occasionally drank too much and treated her mother with disrespect and condescension, particularly when he'd been drinking.

Corcoran struggled throughout her schooling, later learning that she had dyslexia. She attended a local Catholic elementary school and started high school at St. Cecilia High School in Englewood. After flunking several courses during her freshman year, Corcoran transferred to Leonia High School, where she graduated as a D student.

Corcoran graduated from St. Thomas Aquinas College with a degree in education in 1971, faring better than she had in her previous schooling.

Career
After graduating college, she taught school for a year but soon moved on. She had worked a total of 20 jobs by the time she was 23, including a side job renting apartments in New York City. While she was a waitress, her boyfriend convinced her to work for a real estate company. She wanted to be her own boss, and in 1973, while working as a receptionist for the Giffuni Brothers' real estate company in New York City, co-founded The Corcoran-Simonè with her boyfriend, who loaned $1,000. She split from her boyfriend seven years later after he told her he was going to marry her secretary and she then formed her own firm, The Corcoran Group.

In the mid-1970s, she also began publishing The Corcoran Report, a newsletter covering real estate data trends in New York City.

In 2001, Corcoran sold her business to NRT for $66 million.

In September 2017, Corcoran was announced as a contestant for season 25 of Dancing with the Stars, where she was partnered with Keo Motsepe.

Personal life
Corcoran lives in Manhattan with her husband, Bill Higgins, a retired Navy captain and former FBI agent who participated in the Gulf War. The couple married in 1988. Corcoran gave birth to their son in 1994, via in vitro fertilization, with an egg donated by her sister Florence. The couple later adopted a daughter.

In 2001, she purchased a 2,700-square-foot apartment in a co-op building on Park Avenue for $3.5 million.

In 2015, Corcoran purchased a penthouse unit on Fifth Avenue for $10 million.

In 2019, for her 70th birthday, she held a mock funeral.

Her hobbies include skiing and going to the beach.

Corcoran has dyslexia and was labeled the 'dumb kid' by her teachers and classmates. According to Corcoran, the bullying "drove her to work harder and learn the skills she needed to succeed".

Selected bibliography
  (co-authored with Bruce Littlefield)
 
  (co-authored with Bruce Littlefield)

References

External links
 

1949 births
Living people
American people of Irish descent
20th-century American businesspeople
20th-century American businesswomen
20th-century American women writers
21st-century American businesspeople
21st-century American businesswomen
21st-century American non-fiction writers
21st-century American women writers
American business writers
Women business writers
American columnists
American consulting businesspeople
American finance and investment writers
American financial commentators
American real estate businesspeople
American television hosts
American women chief executives
Businesspeople from New Jersey
Businesspeople from New York City
Participants in American reality television series
Leonia High School alumni
People from Edgewater, New Jersey
St. Cecilia High School (New Jersey) alumni
St. Thomas Aquinas College alumni
Television producers from New York City
American women columnists
Writers from New Jersey
Writers from New York City
American women non-fiction writers
20th-century American non-fiction writers
American women television producers
Women business and financial journalists
American women television presenters
Television producers from New Jersey
People with dyslexia